The Windsor–Detroit Bridge Authority (WDBA) is the Canadian federal Crown corporation responsible for administering the construction of the Gordie Howe International Bridge between Windsor, Ontario and Detroit, Michigan. Once the bridge is complete the WDBA will also manage the bridge's operation, including setting and collecting tolls.

Lisa Raitt, then-Minister of Transport, appointed Michael Cautillo, Mark R. McQueen, William Graham, and Caroline Mulroney Lapham as the first board of directors of the WDBA. Of the board members, Cautillo was appointed the authority's president and CEO and McQueen was appointed chairman of the board. While recognizing that the individuals first appointed to the body on July 30, 2014, all had strong financial expertise, the Windsor Star noted that none of them had local ties to the Windsor region.

Tom Mulcair, New Democratic Party leader and then-Leader of the Official Opposition in the Canadian Parliament, noted that three of the first four appointees were donors to the Conservative Party of Canada.

On January 1, 2016, retired Provincial Liberal Minister Dwight Duncan was appointed to be the interim chair of the Board. On December 14, 2016, he was appointed to a five-year term as the Board's permanent chair.

References

External links
 

Canadian federal Crown corporations
Canada–United States border
Transportation in Detroit
Transport in Windsor, Ontario